The Platform for Progress (Bosnian: Platforma za progres, abbreviated PzP) is a centrist political party in Bosnia and Herzegovina, founded on 25 November 2018. At the party's founding convention, the 1,200 delegates chose Mirsad Hadžikadić as president of the party and Aleksandar Eskić as vice president.

History

2020 municipal elections
The party has supported electronic voting, similar to the system used in Estonia. The party organized several protests in 2020. On 16 May 2020, it organized protests in Mostar, rallying in support of elections which had not been held in the city since 2008. The party held similar protests in Tuzla and Sarajevo, in which they called for the 2020 Bosnian municipal elections to be held no later than 15 November.

2022 general election
The Platform for Progress announced its president, Mirsad Hadžikadić's, candidacy in the Bosnian general election on 9 December 2021, running for Bosnian Presidency member and representing the Bosniaks.

Elections

Parliamentary elections

Presidency elections

References

External links
Official Website

2018 establishments in Bosnia and Herzegovina
Political parties established in 2018
Pro-European political parties in Bosnia and Herzegovina
Centrism in Europe